Unni may refer to:

People

 Unni (Indian name)
 Unni (Norwegian given name)
 Unni (bishop) 9th century German bishop

Indian Malayalam films
 Unni (1989 film)
 Unni (2007 film)
 Unni Vanna Divasam (1984)

Other uses
 Unni appam, an Indian snack